The New Zealand Nurses Organisation (NZNO) is New Zealand's largest trade union and professional organisation that represents the nursing profession, midwives and caregivers.

It is one of the oldest organisations of this type in the world, tracing its lineage back to the Wellington Private Nurses Association formed in 1905.

NZNO produces a monthly journal, Kai Tiaki Nursing New Zealand.

The NZNO is affiliated with the New Zealand Council of Trade Unions, and the International Council of Nurses.  NZNO also works closely with a number of other international organisations including the World Health Organization (WHO), the International Labour Organization (ILO), UNICEF and UNESCO.

See also

Nursing in New Zealand

External links
 

1905 establishments in New Zealand
New Zealand Council of Trade Unions
International Council of Nurses
Healthcare trade unions in New Zealand
Trade unions established in 1905
Nursing in New Zealand